Hugo Karl Anton Pernice (9 November 1829 – 31 December 1901) was a German gynecologist and obstetrician born in Halle an der Saale. He was the son of legal scholar Ludwig Wilhelm Anton Pernice (1799-1861), and the father of classical archaeologist Erich Pernice (1864-1945) and Agnes Ballowitz, nee Pernice, wife of Emil Ballowitz.   

Pernice studied at the Universities of Göttingen, Halle, Bonn and Prague. In 1852 he earned his medical doctorate at Halle, where afterwards he remained as an assistant to Anton Friedrich Hohl (1789-1862). In 1858 he became a professor of gynecology and obstetrics at the University of Greifswald, as well as director of the OB/GYN clinic.

He was an instructor and medical practitioner at Greifswald for over 40 years, retiring in 1899. In 1863 he became the first chairman of the Medizinischen Vereins Greifswald (Medical Association of Greifswald).

Selected publications 
 Operationum in arte obstetricia examinatio critica et historica (1855)
 Die Geburten mit Vorfall der Extremitäten neben dem Kopfe (1858) 
 Ueber den Scheintod Neugeborener und dessen Behandlung mit elektrischen Reizen (1863)

References 
 Obstetrics and Gynecology at the University of Greifswald (biography translated from German)

Literature 
 

German gynaecologists
German obstetricians
Academic staff of the University of Greifswald
1829 births
1901 deaths